Mauro Valentini may refer to:

 Mauro Valentini (footballer, born 1964), Italian footballer
 Mauro Valentini (footballer, born 1973), Sammarinese footballer